Verbena officinalis, the common vervain or common verbena, is a perennial herb native to Europe. It grows up to 70 cm high, with an upright habitus. The lobed leaves are toothed, and the delicate spikes hold clusters of two-lipped mauve flowers.

This plant prefers limey soils; it is occasionally grown as an ornamental plant but perhaps more often for the powerful properties some herbalists ascribe to it. Propagation is by root cuttings or seed. It is widely naturalised outside its native range, for example in North America.

Common names and taxonomy

It is also known as simpler's joy or holy herb, or more ambiguously as "mosquito plant" or "wild hyssop". The common name "blue vervain" is also sometimes used, but also refers to V. hastata. And of course, being the only member of its genus in much of its range, it is also simply known as "vervain" locally.

The common names of V. officinalis in many Central and Eastern European languages often associate it with iron, for example:
 Echtes Eisenkraut (German: "true ironherb")
 IJzerhard (Dutch: "iron-hard")
 Læge-Jernurt (Danish: "medical ironherb")
 Železník lekársky (Slovak: "medical ironherb")
 Rohtorautayrtti (Finnish: "medical ironherb")
 Közönséges vasfű (Hungarian: "common irongrass")

Common vervain was scientifically described by Carl Linnaeus his 1753 Species Plantarum. The scientific name references the Ancient Roman term verbena, used for any sacrificial herb considered very powerful (as described e.g. by Pliny the Elder). Officinalis, meanwhile, is Latin for "used in medicine or herbalism".

Systematics
One of the few species of Verbena native to regions outside the Americas, it is derived from the lineage nowadays occurring widely across North America. It might be closest to a group including such species as the white vervain (V. urticifolia), V. lasiostachys or V. menthifolia, and perhaps the swamp verbena (V. hastata). As these, it is diploid with 14 chromosomes.

Numerous local varieties have been described, some of them as distinct species or subspecies. The following are often accepted today:
 Verbena officinalis var. africana (R. Fern. & Verdc.) Munir (=V. officinalis ssp. africana R.Fern. & Verdc.)
 Verbena officinalis var. eremicola Munir
 Verbena officinalis var. gaudichaudii Briq.
 Verbena officinalis var. macrostachya (F. Muell.) Benth. (=V. macrostachya)
 Verbena officinalis var. monticola Munir
 Verbena officinalis var. officinalis L. (=V. domingensis)

The Texas vervain (V. halei) is sometimes included in V. officinalis as a subspecies or variety. But despite the outward similarity, biogeography alone strongly suggests there is really no justification to include this North American native here, and DNA sequence data agrees. Instead, V. halei seems to be closely related to V. macdougalii, perhaps with some interbreeding with the V. menthifolia lineage which might explain its Common Vervain-like traits.

Use by humans

Common vervain has been held in high esteem since classical antiquity; it has long been associated with divine and other supernatural forces, and it has an equally long-standing use as a medicinal plant. Herbal capsules are used as a soporific drug in much the same way as for the better known valerian.

Verbena officinalis herb has been used in the traditional Austrian medicine internally (as tea or liqueur) for treatment of infections and fever. Medical use of Common Vervain is usually as a herbal tea; Nicholas Culpeper's 1652 The English Physitian discusses folk uses. "Vervain", presumably this species, is one of the original 38 Bach flower remedies, prescribed against "over-enthusiasm". In the modern era, it is sometimes considered a powerful "ally" of poets and writers, as its relaxing effects can relieve writer's block. It cannot be considered safe to use during pregnancy as it might cause miscarriages.

While common vervain is not native to North America, it has been introduced there and the Pawnee have adopted it as an entheogen enhancer and in oneiromancy, and is often referred to as the North American version of Calea zacatechichi.

In western Eurasia, the term "verbena" or "vervain" usually refers to this, the most widespread and common member of the mostly American genus occurring there. It was called "tears of Isis" in Ancient Egypt, and later on "Juno's tears". In Ancient Greece, it was dedicated to Eos Erigineia. In the early Christian era, folk legend stated that Common Vervain was used to staunch Jesus' wounds after his removal from the cross; hence names like "Holy Herb" or (e.g. in Wales) "Devil's bane".

Because of the association with the Passion of Christ, it came to be used in ointments to drive out and repel "demonic" illness.  Vervain flowers are engraved on cimaruta, Italian  anti-stregheria charms. In the 1870 The History and Practice of Magic by "Paul Christian" (Jean-Baptiste Pitois) it is employed in the preparation of a mandragora charm.

Hazlitt's Faiths and Folklore (1905) quotes Aubrey's Miscellanies (1721): "Vervain and Dill / Hinder witches from their will."

A Royal Navy  of the World War I era was named , and in World War II a Group 1  bore the same name; a Group 2 vessel of the latter class was called . The only Verbena widely found in England in a native state is common vervain, though it is just as possible that the names reference the popular ornamental verbenas, such as the garden vervain.

Chemistry
Chemical investigations of petroleum ether and chloroform extracts led to the isolation of β-sitosterol, ursolic acid, oleanolic acid, 3-epiursolic acid, 3-epioleanolic acid and minor triterpenoids of derivatives of ursolic acid and oleanolic acids. Chromatographic purification of the methanol extract yield two iridoid glucosides (verbenalin and hastatoside), a phenylpropanoid glycoside, verbascoside and β-sitosterol-D-glucoside. Hastatoside and verbenalin have sleep-promoting (soporific) properties. It also contains a monoterpene alcohol called verbenol.  In another study, four compounds were isolated and identified as apigenin, 4'-hydroxywogonin, verbenalin, and hastatoside. Aucubin has also been found as one of the active constituents.

Footnotes

References

External links

 
 
 

officinalis
Flora of Europe
Medicinal plants
Garden plants of Europe
Herbs
Flora of Lebanon
Plants described in 1753
Taxa named by Carl Linnaeus